Fakhrud Rural District is in Miyandasht District of Darmian County, South Khorasan province, Iran. At the National Census of 2006, its population (as a part of Qohestan District) was 5,446 in 1,530 households. There were 5,183 inhabitants in 1,481 households at the following census of 2011. At the most recent census of 2016, the population of the rural district was 4,889 in 1,489 households. The largest of its 23 villages was Gask, with 581 people. After the census, Miyandasht District was established by combining Fakhrud and Miyandasht Rural Districts.

References 

Darmian County

Rural Districts of South Khorasan Province

Populated places in South Khorasan Province

Populated places in Darmian County